Antonov Peak is the peak rising to 1316 m in the northwest part of Trakiya Heights on Trinity Peninsula, Antarctic Peninsula.  Situated 4.45 km east of Mount Schuyler, 4.25 km southeast of Sirius Knoll, 4.9 km west by north of Mount Daimler, and 8.23 km north of Skakavitsa Peak in Kondofrey Heights.  Surmounting Russell West Glacier to the north and Victory Glacier to the south.

The peak is named after the Bulgarian automobile constructor Rumen Antonov (b. 1944) who invented an innovative automatic gearbox.

Location

German-British mapping in 1996.

Maps
 Trinity Peninsula. Scale 1:250000 topographic map No. 5697. Institut für Angewandte Geodäsie and British Antarctic Survey, 1996.
 Antarctic Digital Database (ADD). Scale 1:250000 topographic map of Antarctica. Scientific Committee on Antarctic Research (SCAR), 1993–2016.

Notes

References
 Bulgarian Antarctic Gazetteer. Antarctic Place-names Commission. (details in Bulgarian, basic data in English)
 Antonov Peak. SCAR Composite Antarctic Gazetteer

External links
 Antonov Peak. Copernix satellite image

Mountains of Trinity Peninsula
Bulgaria and the Antarctic